The Proposal is the 35th book in the Animorphs series, authored by K.A. Applegate. It is known to have been ghostwritten by Jeffrey Zuehlke. It is narrated by Marco.

Plot summary
Marco's mother, the host to Visser One, is revealed to have survived the events of The Reunion. Marco's father Peter, still believing her dead from the "boating accident" several years earlier, marries Nora Robbinette, Marco's math teacher. The stress from his father's actions cause Marco's morphs to go haywire, the results from his morphs are (in order of appearance): an osprey crossed with a lobster, a trout with the arms of a gorilla, a wolf spider crossed with a skunk (a "Skider" or "Spunk" as Marco called it), and finally a poodle and a polar bear (a Poo-Bear as Marco called it). The Yeerks try to use a popular TV icon named William Roger Tennant to try to persuade people to join The Sharing, but the Animorphs expose him on national TV when he is terrorizing Marco who is in poodle morph, which ruins Tennant's reputation.

The book ends with Marco getting a phone call from Visser One, which is covered in greater detail halfway through Visser.

Morphs

Animorphs books
1999 novels